Mahaut or Matilda II of Boulogne (also known as Mathilde, Maud de Dammartin; 1202 – January 1259) was Countess of Boulogne in her own right and Queen of Portugal by marriage to King Afonso III from 1248 until their divorce in 1253. She was the daughter of Ida, Countess of Boulogne and her husband and co-ruler Renaud, Count of Dammartin. She succeeded her mother as Countess of Boulogne in 1216. She was the great-granddaughter of King Stephen of England.

First marriage
In 1223, Matilda married her first husband, Philippe Hurepel, Count of Clermont-en-Beauvais, a younger, arguably illegitimate son of King Philip II of France. By marriage to her, Philippe became her co-ruler of Boulogne, Mortain, Aumale and Dammartin-en-Goële. Count Philippe revolted against his widowed sister-in-law, Blanche of Castile, when his half-brother King Louis VIII died in 1226.

Second marriage
Count Philippe died in 1234, and Matilda reigned independently for three years. To give the county a male head, she married again in 1238 to Infante Afonso, second in line to the Portuguese throne, younger brother of King Sancho II of Portugal. He became King Afonso III of Portugal on 4 January 1248. At that time he renounced Boulogne.

In 1258, Matilda charged Afonso with bigamy, following his marriage to Beatrice of Castile. Pope Alexander in response, imposed interdict upon any place the couple stayed. At the time of Matilda's death, Afonso and Beatriz were still together, despite the Pope's protests.

Later life
She had a son and a daughter with Count Philippe, but no surviving issue with Afonso.  Matilda's then apparent barrenness was the true reason for their divorce. According to reports, Queen Matilda remained in Boulogne and was not allowed to follow her husband to Portugal.

Matilda's daughter, having married a lord de Châtillon-Montjay, predeceased her, and presumably left no surviving issue.

Her son reportedly renounced his rights and went to England, for unknown reasons. Apparently he survived his mother the Countess, but presumably did not leave issue.

She was probably buried at the Cistercian Abbey of Gomerfontaine (nowadays in the French commune of Trie-la-Ville, in the Oise department).

Ancestry

References

Sources

1202 births
1259 deaths
Counts of Boulogne
Portuguese queens consort
Matilda
Matilda
Matilda
Counts of Aumale
Matilda
Counts of Mortain
13th-century French people
13th-century Portuguese people
13th-century women rulers
13th-century French women
13th-century Portuguese women